Simplicia is a genus of plants in the grass family, native to New Zealand.

 Species
 Simplicia buchananii (Zotov) Zotov - New Zealand South Island
 Simplicia laxa Kirk - New Zealand South and North Islands

References

Pooideae
Poaceae genera
Flora of New Zealand